Nikola Grbović (1793–1806) was a Serbian obor-knez of the Kolubara knežina of the Valjevo nahija in the Sanjak of Smederevo, who later became a Serbian Revolutionary. He was born in Mratišić. He was active in the formation of the district and the Ottoman Serb civil army from 1793–94 to 1796, and took part in the operations against Janissary leader Osman Pazvantoğlu. At the end of November 1797 obor-knezes Aleksa Nenadović, Ilija Birčanin and Nikola Grbović from Valjevo brought their forces to Belgrade and forced the besieging janissary forces to retreat to Smederevo. He participated since the outbreak of the First Serbian Uprising, organizing a detachment of his knežina together with his son Milovan. He was a rebel delegate in the talks with Bekir Pasha in 1804. He participated in the liberation of Valjevo and in the first fights around Belgrade.

Mikola Grbović's son Stevan participated in both the First and the Second Serbian Uprising.

Sources

See also
List of Serbian Revolutionaries

References

Sources

18th-century Serbian people
19th-century Serbian people
Serbian revolutionaries
People from Mionica
Serbs from the Ottoman Empire
People of the First Serbian Uprising